Lehemetsa is a village in Võru Parish, Võru County in southeastern Estonia. It has a population of 27 and an area of 5.8 km².

Lehemetsa has a station on currently inactive Valga–Pechory railway.

References

Villages in Võru County
Võru Parish